Tomasz Piotr Nowak (born 22 December 1956 in Kwidzyn) is a Polish politician. He was elected to the Sejm on 25 September 2005, getting 9559 votes in 37 Konin district as a candidate from the Civic Platform list.

See also
Members of Polish Sejm 2005-2007

External links
Tomasz Piotr Nowak - parliamentary page - includes declarations of interest, voting record, and transcripts of speeches.

1956 births
Living people
Civic Platform politicians
People from Kwidzyn
Members of the Polish Sejm 2005–2007
Members of the Polish Sejm 2007–2011
Members of the Polish Sejm 2011–2015
Members of the Polish Sejm 2015–2019
Members of the Polish Sejm 2019–2023
University of Gdańsk alumni